Ariel Adrián Cólzera, also known as Ariel Damián Cólzera, (born April 15, 1986) is an Argentine footballer currently playing for Deportivo Merlo.

References

External links
 
 
 
 
 

1986 births
Living people
Argentine footballers
Argentine expatriate footballers
Argentina youth international footballers
Argentina international footballers
Association football forwards
Boca Juniors footballers
FK Teplice players
Club Atlético Huracán footballers
Gimnasia y Esgrima de Jujuy footballers
Atlético de Rafaela footballers
San Martín de San Juan footballers
Unión de Santa Fe footballers
Unión La Calera footballers
Santiago Wanderers footballers
Crucero del Norte footballers
Club Atlético Temperley footballers
Juventud Unida de Gualeguaychú players
Club Atlético Sarmiento footballers
Deportivo Merlo footballers
Argentine Primera División players
Czech First League players
Chilean Primera División players
Primera Nacional players
Argentine expatriate sportspeople in Chile
Argentine expatriate sportspeople in the Czech Republic
Expatriate footballers in Chile
Expatriate footballers in the Czech Republic